Henri Cunault (26 February 1888 – 19 February 1953) was a French cyclist. He competed in two events at the 1908 Summer Olympics.

References

External links
 

1888 births
1953 deaths
French male cyclists
Olympic cyclists of France
Cyclists at the 1908 Summer Olympics
Place of birth missing